Filip Nguyen (born 14 September 1992) is a Czech professional footballer who plays as a goalkeeper for Czech First League club 1. FC Slovácko.

Club career
Nguyen played youth football with Loko Vltavín and Sparta Prague, joining the latter in 2012. On 20 October 2013, Nguyen appeared in the Sparta first-team squad for the first-team, being an unused substitute for a Czech First League home win over city rivals Dukla Prague. He departed the club in 2015 to play for SK Union Čelákovice. 2016 saw Nguyen complete a move to Czech National Football League side Vlašim. He made his professional debut for Vlašim v. Karviná on 26 March. Forty-two appearances followed across his first three seasons. In February 2018, Slovan Liberec completed the signing of Nguyen; signing until 2021.

International career
Nguyen was eligible to play for Czech Republic or Vietnam at international level.

In July 2019, it was reported that Nguyen, who is of Vietnamese descent, was in the process of becoming naturalizsed as a Vietnamese citizen, which would allow him to represent the country's national team for the succeeding 2022 FIFA World Cup qualifiers.

In September 2020, Nguyen received his first call-up to the Czech Republic national team for their UEFA Nations League match against Scotland on 7 September. Due to positive SARS-CoV-2 tests in the previous Czech squad, all players and the coaching staff which faced Slovakia on 4 September had to be replaced.

Career statistics
.

Honours
Slovácko
Czech Cup: 2021-22

See also
 List of Vietnam footballers born outside Vietnam

References

External links

1992 births
Living people
Czech people of Vietnamese descent
Place of birth missing (living people)
Czech footballers
Association football goalkeepers
Czech First League players
Czech National Football League players
AC Sparta Prague players
FC Sellier & Bellot Vlašim players
FC Slovan Liberec players
1. FC Slovácko players
Sportspeople from Banská Bystrica
Footballers from Prague